The Mississippi Legislature COVID-19 outbreak was the infection of 26 state legislators of the Mississippi Legislature with COVID-19 in the summer of 2020. A total of 49 infections were linked to the outbreak. All legislators survived, but there was one death linked to an infection spread by a legislator.

The outbreak led to delays in the legislators meeting to discuss important budget issues.

Background
In late June 2020, a reporter observed some Republican legislators not wearing masks. Infections struck a total of 26 legislators, including those who were wearing and those who were not wearing masks.

Infected legislators
Not all the names of the legislators were reported in media.
 Ronnie Crudup
 Philip Gunn
 Delbert Hosemann

References 

COVID-19 pandemic in Mississippi
Mississippi Legislature
2020 in Mississippi